Highschool of the Dead is a manga series written by Daisuke Satō and illustrated by Shoji Satō. Set in the present day, the world is struck by a deadly pandemic that turns humans into zombies, euphemistically referred to by the main characters as "Them". The story follows a group of  students at Fujimi High School: Takashi Komuro, Rei Miyamoto, Saeko Busujima, Saya Takagi, and Kohta Hirano; Shizuka Marikawa, the high school's nurse, and a young girl as they fight their way to safety through the deadly streets of Japan during a worldwide catastrophic event known as the "Outbreak".

It began serialization in the September 2006 issue of Fujimi Shobo's manga magazine Monthly Dragon Age. The manga went on hiatus from 2008 to 2010, but after March 2011, only one more chapter was released in April 2013. The series was left unfinished following Daisuke Satō's death on March 22, 2017. Fujimi Shobo and Kadokawa Shoten published seven tankōbon volumes from  March 1, 2007 and April 25, 2011 in Japan.

In North America, the manga is licensed by Yen Press, and the first English volume was released on January 25, 2011. The manga has also been published in Spain by Glénat España, in Germany by Carlsen, in Italy and Brazil by Panini Comics, in Canada and France for French-language publication by Pika Édition, and in Taiwan by Kadokawa Media.

A full-color version of the manga, called  began serialization in the February 2011 issue of Monthly Dragon Age. Kadokawa Shoten released the manga's seven volumes from February 25, 2011 to March 9, 2013. In North America, the full-color edition began serialization in the March 2011 issue of Yen Press' Yen Plus online magazine, and ran until the July 2011 issue. The volumes were later released in two hardcover omnibus volumes on November 22, 2011 and December 17, 2013.

An anime adaptation produced by Madhouse aired in Japan between July and September 2010 on AT-X and other networks. The chapters in the series are called "Acts", and some of the chapter titles are plays on elements of American popular culture (e.g.: "Guns n' Deads"→Guns N' Roses; "The Good, the Bad, and the Dead"→The Good, the Bad, and the Ugly).

Volumes list

Original volumes

English omnibus volumes

Not in tankōbon format
 Act.30: Intellect, Emotion, and Dead (released in the May 2013 issue of Fujimi Shobo's Dragon Age on April 9)

References

External links
 Highschool of the Dead at Fujimi Shobo
 

Highschool of the Dead